The Leyland Beaver-Eel, known officially as the Tender, Armoured, Leyland Type C, was an armoured truck used by the Royal Air Force throughout World War II for airfield defence duties.

Overview
The Leyland Beaver-Eel was one of several armoured vehicle types designed in 1940 on the orders of Lord Beaverbrook and Admiral Sir Edward Evans for the defence of Great Britain, as a part of the hasty measures taken by the British Government following the Dunkirk evacuation and the threat of invasion.

The first prototype was designed, built, tested and approved, and deliveries of production vehicles commenced, all within 10 days of Admiral Evans’ visit to the Leyland Motors factory in June 1940.  Leyland built 250 Beaver-Eels in its own factory, whilst an additional 86 were built by the London, Midland and Scottish Railway's Derby Carriage Works.

The Beaver-Eel consisted of an open topped armoured body mounted a Leyland Retriever 3-ton 6x4 lorry chassis. The vehicle was armed with a 20mm cannon and .303in machine guns.

The Beaver-Eel was used throughout the war by the Royal Air Force on the British mainland for aerodrome and aircraft factory defence.

See also
British armoured fighting vehicle production during World War II

References

World War II armoured fighting vehicles of the United Kingdom
Beaver-Eel
Vehicles introduced in 1940
Military vehicles introduced from 1940 to 1944